Carl Hårleman (23 June 1886 – 20 August 1948) was a Swedish gymnast and track and field athlete who competed in the 1908 and 1912 Summer Olympics. In 1908 he was part of the Swedish gymnastics team that won the all-around gold medal. Four years later he finished twelfth in the pole vault competition.

In 1913 Hårleman placed second in the pole vault at the British AAA championships. In 1917 he won the Swedish pole vault title, and set a national record that stood until 1921.

Hårleman was born in a noble family. He worked in insurance; served in the Swedish Army, reaching the rank of captain, and acted as secretary-general of several sports associations.

See also
 Dual sport and multi-sport Olympians

References

External links
 

1886 births
1948 deaths
Swedish male artistic gymnasts
Swedish male pole vaulters
Olympic gymnasts of Sweden
Olympic athletes of Sweden
Gymnasts at the 1908 Summer Olympics
Athletes (track and field) at the 1912 Summer Olympics
Olympic gold medalists for Sweden
Olympic medalists in gymnastics
Medalists at the 1908 Summer Olympics
Sportspeople from Västerås